Taunton was a rural district in Somerset, England, from 1894 to 1974.

It was created in 1894 under the Local Government Act 1894.

In 1974 it was abolished under the Local Government Act 1972 when it became part of Taunton Deane district.

The parishes which were in the rural district included Ash Priors, Bickenhall, Bishop's Hull, Bishops Lydeard, Burrowbridge, Cheddon Fitzpaine, Churchstanton, Combe Florey, Comeytrowe, Corfe, Cothelstone, Creech St Michael, Curland, Durston, Halse, Hatch Beauchamp, Kingston St Mary, Lydeard St Lawrence, North Curry, Norton Fitzwarren, Orchard Portman, Otterford, Pitminster, Ruishton, Staple Fitzpaine, Staplegrove, Stoke St Gregory, Stoke St Mary, Thornfalcon, Tolland, Somerset, Trull, West Bagborough, West Hatch and West Monkton.

References

Taunton Rural District at Britain Through Time
Local Government Act 1972

Districts of England created by the Local Government Act 1894
Districts of England abolished by the Local Government Act 1972
History of Somerset
Local government in Somerset
Rural districts of England